Brockville can mean:

 Brockville, a Canadian city
 Brockville Collegiate Institute
 Brockville railway station
 Brockville Tikis
 Brockville (electoral district), a defunct Canadian federal electoral district
 Brockville (provincial electoral district), a defunct Ontario provincial electoral district
 Brockville, New Zealand, a suburb of Dunedin
 Brockville Park, the former stadium of Falkirk F.C.
 , a Royal Canadian Navy minesweeper